Abd ol Jabbar (also Romanized as ‘Abd ol Jabbār) is a village in Bedevostan-e Gharbi Rural District, Khvajeh District, Heris County, East Azerbaijan Province, Iran. At the 2006 census, its population was 177, in 35 families.

References 

Populated places in Heris County